Paresh Rathwa is a traditional Pithora painter from Chhota Udaipur district, Gujarat, India.

He was awarded the Padma Shri in 2023.

References

People from Udaipur district
Living people